Eumecosomyia hambletoni is a species of ulidiid or picture-winged fly in the genus Eumecosomyia of the family Ulidiidae.
The species' habitat is Guatemala.

References

Ulidiidae
Insects described in 1966